Aleksandr Mozin (born 9 June 1961) is a retired Russian speed skater who won the silver all-round medal at the European championships in 1986. He competed at the 1988 Winter Olympics in the 10,000 m event and finished in 18th place. 

Personal bests 
500 m – 39.49 (1984)
1000 m – 1:20.92 (1985)
1500 m – 1:56.8 (1985)
5000 m – 6:55.54 (1981)
10000 m – 14:28.91 (1988)

References

1961 births
Living people
Olympic speed skaters of the Soviet Union
Speed skaters at the 1988 Winter Olympics
Soviet male speed skaters